Jeffers is a surname.

Jeffers may also refer to:

Jeffers, Minnesota, a small city in the United States
Jeffers, Montana, a census-designated place in the United States
Jeffers Petroglyphs in Minnesota
USS Jeffers (DD-621) 
Audrey Jeffers Highway in Trinidad and Tobago
Jeffers High School in Painesdale, Michigan, United States